Pohatcong may refer to the following in the U.S. state of New Jersey:

Pohatcong Creek, also called the Pohatcong River, a tributary of the Delaware River
Pohatcong Mountain, a ridge in the Appalachian Mountains of northwestern New Jersey
Pohatcong Township, New Jersey

See also